Germany was represented at the 1956 Winter Olympics in Cortina d'Ampezzo, Italy by a United Team of Germany of athletes from the (Federal Republic of Germany (FRG), West Germany) and, for the first time, also from the (German Democratic Republic (GDR), East Germany) which had not joined in 1952.

The results were rather disappointing as only 2 medals were scored against emerging competition. Rosa "Ossi" Reichert won gold at the women's giant slalom, and Harry Glaß took bronze in the K90 individual jump.

Medalists

Alpine skiing

Men

Women

Bobsleigh

Cross-country skiing

Men

Men's 4 × 10 km relay

Women

Women's 3 x 5 km relay

Figure skating

Men

Women

Pairs

Ice hockey

Group A
Top two teams advanced to Medal Round.

Canada 4-0 Germany
Italy 2-2 Germany
Germany 7-0 Austria

Games for 1st-6th places

USA 7-2 Germany
USSR 8-0 Germany
Canada 10-0 Germany
Czechoslovakia 9-3 Germany
Germany 1-1 Sweden

Nordic combined 

Events:
 normal hill ski jumping (Three jumps, best two counted and shown here.)
 15 km cross-country skiing

Ski jumping

Speed skating

Men

References
Official Olympic Reports
International Olympic Committee results database
 Olympic Winter Games 1956, full results by sports-reference.com

Nations at the 1956 Winter Olympics
1956
Winter Olympics